The Libertarian Party of Alaska is the affiliate of the Libertarian Party (LP) in Alaska, headquartered in Anchorage.

It is the third-largest active party in Alaska and has the highest percentage of registered Libertarians of any state. Since 2012 candidates running as Libertarians who have won the Democratic-Libertarian-Independence primary have always polled between 5% to 30% in at least one state or federal election every election.

Since Libertarian presidential candidates were on the ballot in 1976, Alaska has been a stronghold for Libertarians with it being their best-performing state in every election until 1992 and was in the top five except in 2004 and 2008. Many of the first offices held by Libertarians were in Alaska.

History

The Alaskan Libertarian Party was founded shortly after the national party and grew to become a stronghold for the new party in the late seventies and throughout the eighties. In 1973 John Hospers and Tonie Nathan, the party's 1972 presidential and vice presidential nominees, spoke at the party's first state convention in Fairbanks to fifty members of the party. During the 1980 Presidential election Ed Clark and Eugene McCarthy both appeared and spoke at their state convention. Two years later the party gained the most votes for a non-write in third party candidate for governor with Dick Randolph receiving 14.9% of the vote and would maintain it until 1990. However, in 1985 Randolph left to run as a Republican in the 1986 gubernatorial election. Despite the success in 1982 the 1986 Alaska gubernatorial election proved to be a failure as the party leadership rejected the primary winner, Mary O'Brannon, and after failing to remove her with a lawsuit due to her failing to meet the residency requirements they instead chose to launch a write-in campaign with the lieutenant governor candidate and runner up in the primary, Ed Hoch, as their candidate. O'Brannon defeated Hoch in terms of popular vote with 1,050 against his 107 write-in votes, but she had lost over 14% and 28,000 votes from Randolph's 1982 campaign. Also in 1986 Andre Marrou, the only sitting Libertarian in a state legislature at the time, lost reelection to the state house. In 1988 the party was successful in placing three legislature candidates on the ballot after the state Supreme Court ruled the filing deadline to be unconstitutional. In 1992 the Alaskan affiliate along with the state's Constitution Party affiliate won a lawsuit against the Alaskan state Elections Division after both of their presidential ballot petitions were rejected.

From 2009 to 2010 the party was engaged in a voter registration drive to reach 9,786 registered voters due to a 2004 bill that changed the Alaskan party qualification rules so that a party using the registration test must have registration of 3% of the last vote cast resulting in mid-term years having higher voter registration amounts needed than presidential election years. From April to June 2009 party registration increased by over 1,000 voters.

In 2016, Cean Stevens withdrew after winning the state Libertarian primary to allow Republican Party member and Tea Party favorite nominee of the 2010 Senate election, Joe Miller her spot on the ticket in the 2016 Senate election and Miller was unanimously approved by the executive board to take Stevens' place. Miller came in second place and garnered nearly 30% of the vote, the highest percentage ever received by a Libertarian Senate candidate, but did not beat the total vote record established in 2002 Massachusetts Senate election by Michael Cloud.

Current officials
 Bethel City councilor Richard Robb (2017–present)
 Cordova City councilor Ken Jones (2017–present)
 Alaska Public Office Commissioner Robert Clift (2017–present) – Appointed to a five-year term by Bill Walker
 Alaska Public Office Commissioner Adam Schwemley (2017–present) – Appointed to a five-year term by Bill Walker

Former officials
 State Representative Dick Randolph (1978–1982) – First person to be elected to partisan office under the banner of the Libertarian Party
 State Representative Ken Fanning (1980–1982) – Second person to be elected to partisan office under the banner of the Libertarian Party
 State Representative Andre Marrou (1985–1987) – 1988 Vice Presidential Nominee and 1992 Presidential Nominee
 Juneau City councilor Sara Chambers (2006–2010)

Chairman
 Terrence Shanigan (2016–2016)
 Jon Watts (2016–2022)
 Alex Coker (2022–present)

Electoral performance

Presidential

House

Senate Class II

Senate Class III

Gubernatorial

Voter Registration

The stagnate registration rate is due to the fact that the Democratic-Libertarian-Independence primary is open which allows any member of either party to vote for a candidate.

See also
 List of state parties of the Libertarian Party (United States)

Notes

References

External links
 

Alaska
Political parties established in 1971
Political parties in Alaska